Monin is a French company producing and marketing syrups, liqueurs and fruit purees, primarily intended for commercial use (hotels, restaurants, bars, etc.).

History

The company was founded in 1912 by Georges Monin. But it was not until the 1920s that the first syrups were made.

Georges Monin died in 1944. However, the company remained family-owned. His son Paul took over the management of the company a few months later. He abandoned wine production and concentrated on syrups, establishing a network of dealers throughout France. In 1996, Paul Monin's son, Olivier Monin, established a production unit in Clearwater, Florida. Twelve years later, in 2018, he created one in China, adding to the two French production sites, the Malaysian site and this American site. 

75% of its revenue comes from international business.

The company has locations in France, Asia, North America and Australia.

References

Food and drink companies of France
French companies established in 1912
Companies based in Centre-Val de Loire
Bourges